Todd Woodbridge and Mark Woodforde were the defending champions, but did not participate this year.

Boris Becker and John McEnroe won the title, defeating Guy Forget and Jakob Hlasek 6–3, 6–2 in the final.

Seeds

  John Fitzgerald /  Anders Järryd (semifinals)
  Luke Jensen /  Laurie Warder (quarterfinals)
  Tom Nijssen /  Cyril Suk (first round)
  Goran Ivanišević /  Patrick McEnroe (first round)

Draw

Draw

References
Draw

1992 ATP Tour
Donnay Indoor Championships